Peter Seaton Sherman (8 June 1925 – 30 July 2008) was an Australian rules footballer who played with Richmond and St Kilda in the Victorian Football League (VFL).

Notes

External links 

1925 births
2008 deaths
Australian rules footballers from Victoria (Australia)
Richmond Football Club players
St Kilda Football Club players